Laure Pantalacci is a French Egyptologist who was director of the Institut français d'archéologie orientale from 2005 to 2010.

References

French archaeologists
French women archaeologists
French Egyptologists
Living people
Year of birth missing (living people)
French women historians
Members of the Institut Français d'Archéologie Orientale